Irving Randall Todd (December 15, 1861 – December 27, 1932) was a Canadian lumber merchant and politician.

Born in Milltown, New Brunswick, the son of Charles F. and Annie M. (Porter) Todd, Todd was educated at Hallowell Classical School, New Brunswick High School in Milltown and St. Stephen. When he was eighteen, he entered into business with his father. He worked for the Eastern Pulpwood Company and was president of Fundy Fisheries Company. He was also president of New Brunswick & Canada Railway Company. He was also a Director of the New Brunswick Telephone Company. He was called to the Senate of Canada for the senatorial division of Milltown, New Brunswick on the advice of Conservative Prime Minister Robert Borden in 1918. He served until his death in 1932.

References

 
 

1861 births
1932 deaths
Canadian senators from New Brunswick
Conservative Party of Canada (1867–1942) senators